Esme Rosemary Irwin (13 June 1931 – 18 August 2001) was an English cricketer who played primarily as a right-arm pace bowler. She appeared in 4 Test matches for England in 1960 and 1961, all against South Africa. She played domestic cricket for Middlesex.

References

External links
 
 

1931 births
2001 deaths
People from Hanwell
England women Test cricketers
Middlesex women cricketers